Victor Konwlo (born 1 February 1975) is a Liberian former professional footballer who played for Canon Yaoundé in Cameroon, AS Cannes and AS Nancy in France, AZ in the Netherlands, and Paços de Ferreira and Caldas in Portugal.

In 2001, he also had a trial with Scottish side Raith Rovers, but he was not offered a contract.

References

External links

1975 births
Living people
Liberian footballers
AS Cannes players
AS Nancy Lorraine players
AZ Alkmaar players
Ligue 1 players
Ligue 2 players
Eerste Divisie players
Expatriate footballers in France
Expatriate footballers in the Netherlands
Expatriate footballers in Portugal
Caldas S.C. players
Association football midfielders
Liberia international footballers